Harlaston is a civil parish in the district of Lichfield, Staffordshire, England.  It contains eleven buildings that are recorded in the National Heritage List for England.  Of these, three are listed at Grade II*, the middle of the three grades, and the others are at Grade II, the lowest grade.  The parish contains the village of Harlaston and the smaller settlement of Haselour, and the surrounding countryside.  The listed buildings consist of a church, a small country house and an associated chapel, houses and cottages, a farmhouse, two mileposts, and a telephone kiosk.


Key

Buildings

References

Citations

Sources

Lists of listed buildings in Staffordshire